Susan Rose Paradise Baxter (born September 20, 1956) is a United States district judge of the United States District Court for the Western District of Pennsylvania. She was formerly a United States magistrate judge of the same court.

Early life and education 

Susan Paradise Baxter was born September 20, 1956, in Latrobe, Pennsylvania. She received her Bachelor of Science from Pennsylvania State University in 1978, her Master of Education from Temple University in 1980, and her Juris Doctor from the Temple University Beasley School of Law in 1983.

Professional career 

She began her practice in Washington, D.C., as an associate at the firm of Cole, Raywid and Braverman, now Davis Wright Tremaine, where she became a partner in 1989. Her practice consisted of commercial litigation, antitrust litigation and contract law.

In 1992, she served as the Court Solicitor for the Erie County Court of Common Pleas, representing the judges on the court.

Federal judicial service 

She became a United States magistrate judge for the United States District Court for the Western District of Pennsylvania on January 20, 1995. Later in 1996, she was elected the Director-At-Large of the Federal Magistrate Judges Association.  She became the Chief Magistrate Judge in June 2005 and served until 2009. Her tenure as a magistrate judge ended on September 10, 2018, when she became a district judge.

Expired district court nomination under Obama 

On July 30, 2015, President Barack Obama nominated Baxter to serve as a United States District Judge of the United States District Court for the Western District of Pennsylvania, to the seat vacated by Sean J. McLaughlin, who resigned on August 16, 2013. She received a hearing before the Senate Judiciary Committee on December 9, 2015 and her nomination generated no controversy. On January 28, 2016, her nomination was reported out of committee by voice vote. Her nomination expired on January 3, 2017, with the end of the 114th Congress.

Renomination to district court under Trump 

On December 20, 2017, her renomination by President Donald Trump was announced and sent to the Senate. She was renominated to the same seat.  On February 15, 2018, the Senate Judiciary Committee voted to report her nomination by voice vote. On August 28, 2018, her nomination was confirmed by voice vote. She received her judicial commission on September 10, 2018.

Notable cases 

In Pennsylvania General Energy Company, LLC v. Grant Township in 2015, she found against Grant Township, Pennsylvania and in favor of Pennsylvania General Energy, LLC (PGE) in its claim that the Township's prohibition on injection wells violated the corporation's constitutional rights. The Township was represented by the Community Environmental Legal Defense Fund in the case, which was profiled in Rolling Stone magazine in May 2017.

Personal life 

She is married to Donald L. Baxter Jr. and has two children.

References

External links 
 

1956 births
Living people
20th-century American lawyers
20th-century American judges
21st-century American lawyers
21st-century American judges
Judges of the United States District Court for the Western District of Pennsylvania
Pennsylvania Democrats
Pennsylvania lawyers
Pennsylvania State University alumni
People from Erie, Pennsylvania
People from Latrobe, Pennsylvania
Temple University Beasley School of Law alumni
Temple University College of Education alumni
United States district court judges appointed by Donald Trump
United States magistrate judges
20th-century American women lawyers
21st-century American women lawyers
20th-century American women judges
21st-century American women judges